Moses Mensah (born 10 August 1978 in Ghana) is a former Ghanaian-born Hong Kong professional footballer who played as a left back.

Club career
Moses was born in Ghana. In 2003, he went to Hong Kong to join Hong Kong Third Division League club Kowloon City.

In 2004, Moses signed for Hong Kong First Division League club Citizen.

On 28 January 2011, Moses scored his first goal for Citizen against HKFC, which the match wins 3–1.

In 2012, after Moses had lived in Hong Kong for over 7 years, he became a Hong Kong local player.

In 2013, Moses became the first foreign player who played for Citizen for over 9 years.

In 2013, Moses signed for Hong Kong First Division League club Rangers.

On 15 September 2013,  Moses scored his first goal for Rangers against Yokohama FC Hong Kong, which the match won 3–2.

In November 2013, Moses got the HKSAR passport.

In 2014, Moses signed for Hong Kong Premier League club YFCMD.

On 20 July 2015, Moses signed for Hong Kong Premier League club South China.

References

External links
 Moses Mensah at HKFA

1978 births
Living people
Hong Kong footballers
Ghanaian footballers
Ghanaian emigrants to Hong Kong
Naturalized footballers of Hong Kong
Association football defenders
Association football fullbacks
Hong Kong First Division League players
Hong Kong Premier League players
Citizen AA players
Hong Kong Rangers FC players
South China AA players
Metro Gallery FC players